The Republican Noise Machine: Right-Wing Media and How It Corrupts Democracy is a 2004 book written by David Brock which chronicles how the American right wing was able to build its media infrastructure, and the tactics used by right-wing groups to pressure the media and spread misinformation to the public. The book was the prelude to Brock's launching of his organization Media Matters for America.

Author

David Brock authored The Real Anita Hill in 1993, and had a hand in many other political books, including examinations of Bill and Hillary Clinton. He has said that his previous work was lies and distortions and disavowed his previous attacks he calls a smear campaign funded by wealthy right wing groups. His book Blinded By The Right: The Conscience Of An Ex-Conservative was a 2002 best-seller.

Summary
Brock details the conservative media strategy subsequent to the time of Barry Goldwater, predicated on corporate funding of think tanks, such as the Heritage Foundation. Brock believes such think tanks serve not only as propagandists, but as tutors for industry lobbyists, and a training ground for conservative journalists who are not limited by the standards of objectivity and impartiality emphasized in the conventional news media.

According to Brock, conservative and Republican strategists "concoct smears, distortions, and outright lies", and then disseminate the product as 'talking points' to right-wing radio and Fox News, which Brock says set a narrative echoed by more mainstream news sources.

In an article published in Salon, Brock describes his involvement in a “Republican Noise Machine", by recounting that “[f]rom the Washington Times, to a stint as a 'research fellow' at the Heritage Foundation (the Right’s premier think tank), to a position as an 'investigative writer' at the muckraking magazine The American Spectator, and as the author of a best-selling right-wing book, I forwarded the right-wing agenda not as an open political operative or advocate but under the guise of journalism and punditry, fueled by huge sums of money from right-wing billionaires, foundations, and self-interested corporations.”

References

External links
 Media Matters with Bob McChesney Interview of David Brock (Jan 2, 2005)
 BuzzFlash Interview of David Brock
  David Brock Interview, "All Things Considered," National Public Radio (July 2, 2001)
 David Horowitz, "Believe David Brock at your own risk," Salon (April 17, 2002)
 "Brock, Horowitz and the anti-gay slur." Chad Conway responds to David Horowitz, Salon (April 30, 2002)
 Laura Kipnis, "Brock Attack: The formerly right-wing shark behind Media Matters," Slate (May 18, 2004)

2004 non-fiction books
Books about media bias
Books about politics of the United States
Books by David Brock